Fictional is the name of a German musical project formed by Gerrit Thomas (also known as Rote, or Rote X), serving as a balance between two other projects he is involved in, Funker Vogt and Ravenous.  Fictional has released music on the Industrial and Electronic body music labels Metropolis Records and Zoth Ommog.

Members / History

Fictional was originally formed as a solo-project by Gerritt Thomas in the late 1990s.  The sound of the project could best be described as a combination of EBM and synthpop.  Thomas wrote, produced, and sung all of Fictional's first release, Fictitious, with the exception of two songs with guest vocalist Tim Fockenbrock (of Thomas's first project, Ravenous).  The debut album was originally released on Zoth Ommog in 1999, though after this label went out of business, Metropolis released Fictitious[+], featuring live versions of 'Dream Of God' and 'Blue Lights'.

Fictional's second release, Fiction, found Thomas working with singer Jason Bainbridge.  Like most Funker Vogt releases, Fictional's vocals contains lyrics written with the help of manager and friend Kai Schmidt.

Discography

Fictitious, (Zoth Ommog - 1999), CD
Fictitious [+], (Metropolis Records - 2001), CD (US release of debut album with 2 bonus live tracks)
Fiction, (Metropolis Records - 2003), CD

See also

Funker Vogt
Ravenous
Fusspils 11

External links 
 Official English language site for Funker Vogt and other Gerrit Thomas projects. 
Fictional English Fansite

Electro-industrial music groups
German musical groups
Metropolis Records artists
Zoth Ommog Records artists